Donald Russell Rader (September 5, 1893 – June 26, 1983) was a Major League Baseball shortstop who played with the Chicago White Sox in  and the Philadelphia Phillies in .

External links

1893 births
1983 deaths
Major League Baseball shortstops
Baseball players from Indiana
Chicago White Sox players
Philadelphia Phillies players
Minor league baseball managers
Pendleton Buckaroos players
Lincoln Railsplitters players
Helena Senators players
Venice Tigers players
Vernon Tigers players
Sioux City Indians players
St. Joseph Drummers players
Hutchinson Wheatshockers players
Portland Beavers players
Beaumont Exporters players
New Orleans Pelicans (baseball) players
Dallas Steers players
Des Moines Demons players
Lincoln Links players